Huancané (  wanqa a big stone, -ni a suffix, "the one with a big stone (or big stones)") is the capital of the province of Huancané in Peru. The town is located about north of Lake Titicaca.  The majority of the residents of Huancané's 7,000 speak Aymara.

References 

Populated places in the Puno Region